Mean is a term used in mathematics and statistics.

Mean may also refer to:

Music
 Mean (album), a 1987 album by Montrose
 "Mean" (song), a 2010 country song by Taylor Swift from Speak Now
 "Mean", a song by Pink from Funhouse
 Meane, or mean, a vocal music term from 15th and 16th century England

Other uses
Ethic mean, a sociology term
Mean (magazine), an American bi-monthly magazine
Meanness, a personal quality
MEAN (solution stack), a free and open-source JavaScript software stack for building dynamic web sites and web applications
A synonym of frugal

See also
 Meaning (disambiguation)
 Means (disambiguation)
 Meen (disambiguation)